Gagea nakaiana is an Asian  species of plants in the lily family. It is native to northeastern China (Heilongjiang, Jilin, Liaoning), Russia (Kamchatka, Kuril Islands, Sakhalin, Primorye, Altay Krai, Krasnoyarsk), Japan, Korea, Nepal, Bhutan, Pakistan, and northern India.

Flowers are yellow.

References

nakaiana
Flora of Asia
Plants described in 1939